Tiger Island can refer to:

 Tiger Island, also called El Tigre Island, a disputed volcanic island administered now by Honduras
 Tiger Island (Antarctica), off Victoria Land, Antarctica
 Tigres Island, Angola
 Cồn Cỏ island, off the coast of central Vietnam 
 Tiger Island (Dreamworld), wildlife attraction at the Dreamworld amusement park on the Gold Coast, Queensland, Australia
 Tiger Island (1930 film), silent Australian film
 Menghu Islet (Tiger Island), Lieyu Township, Kinmen County, Fujian, Republic of China (Taiwan)